Jane Routh is a contemporary poet living in Lancashire in the United Kingdom.

Published works 
To date she has published five collections of poetry:
Listening to the Night (Smith/Doorstop, 2018)
The Gift of Boats (Smith/Doorstop, 2010)
Waiting for H5N1 (Templar Poetry, 2007)
Teach Yourself Mapmaking (Smith/Doorstop, 2006)
Circumnavigation (Smith/Doorstop, 2002)

Routh has also published a place journal Falling Into Place (Smith/Doorstop, 2014).

Awards 
Routh's first collection Circumnavigation was shortlisted for the Forward Prize for Best First Collection. Her second collection Teach Yourself Mapmaking was a Poetry Book Society Recommendation. The Gift of Boats won the Cardiff International Poetry Competition.

References

21st-century English poets
English women poets
Living people
Year of birth missing (living people)
21st-century English women